Sahlin is a Swedish surname.

Geographical distribution
As of 2014, 77.4% of all known bearers of the surname Sahlin were residents of Sweden (frequency 1:2,898), 16.5% of the United States (1:499,656), 1.8% of Norway (1:65,928), 1.1% of Finland (1:116,953) and 1.0% of Canada (1:855,768).

In Sweden, the frequency of the surname was higher than national average (1:2,898) in the following counties:
 1. Jämtland County (1:763)
 2. Västernorrland County (1:827)
 3. Västmanland County (1:1,562)
 4. Gävleborg County (1:2,222)
 5. Västra Götaland County (1:2,558)

People
Anna Sahlin (born 1976), Swedish singer
Dan Sahlin (born 1967), Swedish former professional football forward who won three caps for his country.
Don Sahlin (1928–1978), Muppet designer and builder who worked for Jim Henson from 1962 to 1977
Ivar Sahlin (1895–1980), Swedish track and field athlete who competed in the 1920 Summer Olympics.
Margit Sahlin (1914–2003), one of the first three female priests in the Church of Sweden.
Martin Sahlin, director of the video games Unravel and Unravel Two.
Mona Sahlin (born 1957), Swedish politician and the former leader of the Swedish Social Democratic Party.

References

Swedish-language surnames